Kwebiha Joyce sometimes referred to as Kwebiha Joyce Mama Mission is a Ugandan politician. She was an Independent candidate for the Women Representative (MP) for Kyenjojo District in the eighth Parliament of Uganda.

Career 
She is the director of Kyenjojo Development Radio.

Politics 
During the opening of National Unity Platform Office in November 2020 in Kyenjojo, Joyce was the guest of honor for the event. She requested peace and harmony during and after the 2021 election period despite the political differences among Ugandans during and after the political season.

In 2007, a year when Joyce joined the 8th Parliament of Uganda as a woman Member of Parliament of Uganda, she received death threats from supporters of one of the candidates in the district Local Council 5 chairperson by-elections. Joyce said that her death threats were a result of allegations that she was campaigning for one of the candidates in the elections. These death threats also came with threats of burning down Kyenjojo Development Radio, a radio station of which she is a director.

Later in the next parliament, 28-year-old Linda Timbigamba beat the incumbent, Joyce Kwebiha with 24,922 votes, for the  Kyenjojo Woman Member of Parliament seat and Kwebiha got 20,106 votes. She was followed by Miriam Kesiime with 14,123 votes and Theresa Kabasinguzi came last with 11,911.

See also 
 List of members of the eighth Parliament of Uganda.

References 

  

Living people
People from Kyenjojo District
Members of the Parliament of Uganda
Women members of the Parliament of Uganda
Year of birth missing (living people)